Heaven Right Here on Earth is the third album by the Oakland, California group The Natural Four. It was released in 1975 on Curtom Records.

Track listing
"Heaven Right Here on Earth" - (Joe Reaves, Leroy Hutson)  4:15
"Love's So Wonderful" - (Hutson)  3:25
"Count On Me" -(Lowrell Simon, Rich Tufo, Tommy Green)  4:05
"Baby Come On" - (Joseph Scott)  3:40
"What Do You Do" -(Daniel Reed, Othie Wright, Quinton Joseph, Tufo, Green)  2:53
"Give This Love a Try" - (Eugene Dixon, James Thompson)  3:43
"What's Happening Here" - (Wright, Joseph, Tufo, Green)  4:32
"While You're Away" - (Hutson, Michael Hawkins)  3:15

Charts

Singles

References

External links
 The Natural Four-Heaven Right Here On Earth at Discogs

1975 albums
The Natural Four albums
Curtom Records albums
Albums produced by Leroy Hutson